Sofie Albinus (born 21 September 1972) is a former professional Danish tennis player. 

Albinus, on 3 February 1992, reached her best singles ranking of world number 163. On 20 August 1990, she peaked at world number 120 in the doubles rankings.

Playing for Denmark at the Fed Cup, Albinus has a win–loss record of 13–11.

ITF finals

Singles (7–2)

Doubles (9–2)

References

External links
 
 
 

1972 births
Living people
Danish female tennis players
20th-century Danish women